The World Alliance of Reformed Churches (WARC) was a fellowship of more than 200 churches with roots in the 16th-century Reformation, and particularly in the theology of John Calvin. Its headquarters was in Geneva, Switzerland. They merged with the Reformed Ecumenical Council in 2010 to form the World Communion of Reformed Churches.

History

The World Alliance of Reformed Churches (WARC) was created in 1970 by a merger of two bodies, the Alliance of the Reformed Churches holding the Presbyterian System, representing Presbyterian and Reformed churches, and the International Congregational Council. The Alliance of the Reformed Churches holding the Presbyterian System was formed in London in 1875. It held councils which had no legislative authority but great moral weight. In them the various Augustinian non-prelatical and in general presbyterial bodies found representation. They were upward of 90 in number, scattered all over the world, with 25,000,000 adherents. The published reports of the proceedings of these councils contain much valuable matter of all kinds, as papers are read, statistics presented, and many speeches made. Councils were held at London, 1875; Edinburgh, 1877; Philadelphia, 1880; Belfast, 1884; London, 1888; Toronto, 1892; Glasgow, 1896; Washington, 1899.

The World Alliance of Reformed Churches had 218 member churches in 107 countries around the world, with some 75 million members. Churches represented in the WARC include Congregational, Presbyterian, Reformed and United churches which have historical roots in the 16th century Reformation.

The WARC Secretariat was located in the Ecumenical Centre in Geneva, Switzerland. It works closely with the World Council of Churches.

In 2000, the WAR was critical of Dominus Iesus, the Congregation for the Doctrine of the Faith's document, and considered calling off a formal dialogue in Rome that year.

On 1 February 2006, Clifton Kirkpatrick, president of the WARC, and Douwe Visser, president of the Reformed Ecumenical Council (REC), said in a joint letter, "We rejoice in the work of the Holy Spirit which we believe has led us to recommend that the time has come to bring together the work of the World Alliance of Reformed Churches and the Reformed Ecumenical Council into one body that will strengthen the unity and witness of Reformed Christians." The resulting new organisation is the World Communion of Reformed Churches.

Assemblies

Presidents
WARC presidents are elected for seven years at every General Council (held septennially):

General Secretaries
From 1970 to 1989 the General Secretary was Rev. Edmond Perret from Switzerland. In 1988 the Executive Committee meeting in Belfast, N. Ireland elected Rev. Dr. Milan Opočenský (Czech Rep.) who held office until 2000. In 2000 Rev. Dr. Setri Nyomi (Ghana) became the General Secretary of WARC, and later WCRC.

Members (2006)
The WARC brought together more than 75 million Christians in over 100 countries around the world.

Member churches are Congregational, Presbyterian, Reformed and united and uniting churches.

Most of these are in the southern hemisphere with many being religious minorities in their countries.

Algeria
Protestant Church of Algeria
American Samoa
Congregational Christian Church in American Samoa
Angola, Republic of
Evangelical Reformed Church of Angola
Argentina
Evangelical Church of the River Plate
Reformed Churches in Argentina
Evangelical Congregational Church
Swiss Evangelical Church
Australia
Uniting Church in Australia
Congregational Federation of Australia
Austria
Reformed Church in Austria
Belgium
United Protestant Church in Belgium
Bermuda
Church of Scotland
Bolivia
Evangelical Presbyterian Church in Bolivia
Botswana
Dutch Reformed Church in Botswana
Brazil
Presbyterian Church of Brazil
Independent Presbyterian Church of Brazil
United Presbyterian Church of Brazil
Christian Reformed Church of Brazil
Evangelical Reformed Churches in Brazil
Arab Evangelical Church of Sao Paulo
Bulgaria
Union of Evangelical Congregational Churches in Bulgaria
Burkina Faso
Reformed Evangelical Church of Burkina Faso
Burma
Mara Evangelical Church
Independent Presbyterian Church of Myanmar
The Presbyterian Church of Myanmar
Cameroon
Presbyterian Church in Cameroon
Presbyterian Church of Cameroon
African Protestant Church
Canada
The Presbyterian Church in Canada / L'Église presbytérienne au Canada
United Church of Canada
Central African Republic
Protestant Church of Christ the King
Chile
Presbyterian Church of Chile
National Presbyterian Church
Presbyterian Evangelical Church in Chile
Colombia
Presbyterian Synod
Congo, Democratic Republic
Presbyterian Community in the Congo
Presbyterian Community of Eastern Kasai
Reformed Community of Presbyterians
Presbyterian Community of Kinshasa
Evangelical Community in Congo
Protestant Community of Shaba
Presbyterian Community of Western Kasai?/Reformed Presbyterian Community in Africa
Congo, Republic
The Evangelical Church of the Congo
Costa Rica
Costa Rican Evangelical Presbyterian Church
Croatia
Reformed Christian Church in Croatia
Cuba
Presbyterian Reformed Church in Cuba
Czech Republic
Evangelical Church of Czech Brethren
Denmark
Reformed Synod of Denmark
Dominican Republic
Dominican Evangelical Church
East Timor
Christian Church in East Timor
Ecuador
United Evangelical Church of Ecuador
Egypt
The Evangelical Church - Synod of the Nile
El Salvador
Reformed Calvinist Church of El Salvador
Equatorial Guinea
Presbyterian Church of Equatorial Guinea
Ethiopia
Ethiopian Evangelical Church Mekane Yesus
France
Reformed Church of France
Reformed Church of Alsace and Lorraine
Malagazy Protestant Church
French Polynesia
Evangelical Church of French Polynesia
Germany
Church of Lippe
Evangelical Reformed Church
Reformed Alliance
Ghana
Evangelical Presbyterian Church, Ghana
Presbyterian Church of Ghana
Greece
Greek Evangelical Church
Grenada
Presbyterian Church in Grenada
Guatemala
National Evangelical Presbyterian Church of Guatemala
Guyana
Presbyterian Church of Guyana
Guyana Congregational Union
Guyana Presbyterian Church
Hong Kong
Church of Christ in China, The Hong Kong Council
Hungary
Reformed Church of Hungary
India
Church of South India
Church of North India
Presbyterian Church of India
Evangelical Church of Maraland
The Church of Christ
Reformed Presbyterian Church, North East India
Indonesia
Karo Batak Protestant Church
Evangelical Church in Kalimantan
Indonesian Christian Church
Evangelical Christian Church in West Papua
Christian Churches of Java
The East Java Christian Church
Christian Church in Luwuk Banggai
Pasundan Christian Church
Protestant Christian Church in Bali
Christian Church in Sulawesi
Christian Church in Central Sulawesi
Christian Church of Southern Sumatra
Christian Church of Sumba
Christian Evangelical Church in Bolaang Mongondow
The Christian Evangelical Church in Halmahera
Christian Evangelical Church in Minahasa
Sangihe-Talaud Evangelical Church
Christian Evangelical Church in Timor
Protestant Church in West Indonesia
Indonesian Protestant Church in Buol Toli-Toli
Indonesian Protestant Church in Donggala
Indonesian Protestant Church in Gorontalo
Protestant Church in the Moluccas
Protestant Church in Southeast Sulawesi
Toraja Church
Toraja Mamasa Church
Iran
Synod of Evangelical Church of Iran
Ireland (Éire)
The Presbyterian Church in Ireland
Israel
St. Andrew's Scots Memorial Church (Church of Scotland)
Italy
Waldensian Evangelical Church (Union of Methodist and Waldensian Churches)
Jamaica
The United Church in Jamaica and the Cayman Islands
Japan
Church of Christ in Japan
Korean Christian Church in Japan
Kenya
Presbyterian Church of East Africa
Reformed Church of East Africa
Kiribati
Kiribati Protestant Church
Korea, Republic of
KiJang
TongHap
DaeShin I
HapDongJeongTong
Latvia
Reformed Church in Latvia
Lebanon
Union of the Armenian Evangelical Churches in the Near East
National Evangelical Synod of Syria and Lebanon
The National Evangelical Union of Lebanon
Lesotho
Lesotho Evangelical Church
Liberia
Presbyterian Church of Liberia
Lithuania
Synod of the Evangelical Reformed Church - Unitas Lithuaniae
Luxembourg
Protestant Reformed Church of Luxemburg H.B.
Madagascar
Church of Jesus Christ in Madagascar
Malawi
Church of Central Africa, Presbyterian – General Synod
Malaysia
Presbyterian Church Malaysia
Marshall Island
Marshalls United Church of Christ-Congregations
Reformed Congregational Churches
Mauritius
Presbyterian Church of Mauritius
Mexico
National Presbyterian Church in Mexico, A. R.
Associate Reformed Presbyterian Church of Mexico
Presbyterian Reformed Church of Mexico
Morocco
Evangelical Church in Morocco
Mozambique
Presbyterian Church of Mozambique
United Congregational Church of Southern Africa
United Church of Christ in Mozambique
Evangelical Church of Christ in Mozambique
Namibia
Namibia Regional Council
Netherlands
The Protestant Church in the Netherlands (former: Nederlandse Hervormde Kerk and Gereformeerde Kerken in Nederland)
Remonstrant Brotherhood
New Caledonia
Evangelical Church in New Caledonia and Loyalty Islands
New Zealand
Presbyterian Church of Aotearoa New Zealand
Niger
Evangelical Church of the Republic of Niger
Nigeria
Presbyterian Church of Nigeria
Christian Reformed Church of Nigeria
Universal Reformed Christian Church (NKST)
Evangelical Reformed Church of Christ
Reformed Church of Christ in Nigeria
United Church of Christ in Nigeria
Niue
Church of Niue
Pakistan
Presbyterian Church of Pakistan
Sialkot Diocese of the Church of Pakistan
Philippines
United Church of Christ in the Philippines
United Evangelical Church of Christ
Poland
Evangelical-Reformed Church in Poland
Portugal
Evangelical Presbyterian Church of Portugal
Reunion
Eglise Protestante de La Réunion
Romania
Reformed Church in Romania – Transylvanian District
Reformed Church in Romania (Oradea)
Rwanda
Presbyterian Church in Rwanda
Senegal
Protestant Church of Senegal
Serbia and Montenegro
Reformed Christian Church in Serbia and Montenegro
Singapore
Presbyterian Church in Singapore
Slovakia
Reformed Church of Slovakia
Slovenia
Reformed Church in Slovenia
Solomon Islands
United Church in Solomon Islands
South Africa
Nederduits Gereformeerde Kerk
Uniting Reformed Church in Southern Africa
Reformed Church in Africa (India)
Reformed Church in Southern Africa
Reformed Presbyterian Church in Southern Africa
United Congregational Church of Southern Africa
Peoples Church of Africa
Uniting Presbyterian Church in Southern Africa
Spain
Spanish Evangelical Church
Sri Lanka
Dutch Reformed Church in Sri Lanka (Ceylon)
Presbytery of Lanka
Sudan
Presbyterian Church of the Sudan
Sweden
The Mission Covenant Church of Sweden
Switzerland
Federation of Swiss Protestant Churches, Schweizerischer Evangelischer Kirchenbund, Fédération des Eglises protestantes de la Suisse, Federazione delle Chiese evangelische della Svizzera
Taiwan
Presbyterian Church in Taiwan
Thailand
Church of Christ in Thailand
Trinidad and Tobago
Church of Scotland
Tunisia
Reformed Church in Tunisia
Tuvalu
Church of Tuvalu
Uganda
Reformed Presbyterian Church in Uganda
Ukraine
Reformed Church in the Carpatho-Ukraine
United Kingdom
Church of Scotland
Presbyterian Church of Wales
Union of Welsh Independents
United Free Church of Scotland
United Reformed Church
The Presbyterian Church in Ireland
Presbyterian Church of Africa
United States of America
Reformed Church in America
United Church of Christ
Christian Reformed Church in North America
Cumberland Presbyterian Church
Cumberland Presbyterian Church in America
Evangelical Presbyterian Church
Korean Presbyterian Church in America
Lithuanian Evangelical Reformed Church
Presbyterian Church (USA)
Uruguay
Valdensian Evangelical Church of the Rio de la Plata
Vanuatu
Presbyterian Church of Vanuatu
Venezuela
Presbyterian Church of Venezuela
Zambia
United Church of Zambia
Reformed Church in Zambia
Zimbabwe
Reformed Church in Zimbabwe
Church of Central Africa Presbyterian – Synod of Harare
Ndebele
Central / Southern Africa
Dutch Reformed Church – Synod of Central Africa
Presbyterian Church of Southern Africa

References

External links

Home page
Member churches
 World Reformed Communion announcement

 
Congregationalism
International bodies of Reformed denominations
Christian organizations established in 1970
Calvinist denominations established in the 20th century